Kingsnorth is a mixed rural and urban village and relatively large civil parish adjoining Ashford in Kent, England. The civil parish includes the district of Park Farm.

Features
The Greensand Way, a long distance footpath stretching from Haslemere in Surrey to Hamstreet in Kent, passes through the parish on the final stretch.

Ashford Town Football Club's ground, Homelands, is just outside the village.

A 20th century primary school in the village has been greatly expanded due to the influx of people moving to the main neighbourhood Park Farm, which has a large supermarket and may eventually have its own rail halt on the Marshlink Line.

The village post office is based in the Kingsnorth Village Hall on Church Hill, although the hamlet or neighbourhood of Stubbs Cross retains its shop/post office. The village cluster of Kingsnorth where the parish church of St Michael and All Angels can be found is quite small.

History
A Roman settlement was discovered at the crossing of two important Roman roads on Westhawk Farm. The centre of the settlement has been preserved unexcavated as an open space, but before building began on the rest of the site, part of a Roman road was uncovered. There was evidence to show that there had been timber buildings at the side of the road, some of which were associated with ironworking. A shrine or temple was also found with a water-hole which contained 74, mostly 2nd-century coins probably left as offerings. Over 250 coins and many other artefacts were discovered on the site together with a Roman cemetery and an Iron Age burial.

A site at Park Farm, which is crossed by one of the Roman roads, also yielded Roman pottery fragments, some of which were associated with the regional distribution of salt, probably made on Romney Marsh.

A transcript of the Domesday Book of 1086 indicates that there was a settlement at Kingsnorth controlled by the Manor of Wye. One explanation of the name is that it derived from the Old English cyninges snad, detached land belonging to a royal estate. Another suggestion is that the settlement took its name from Jutish people 'Kyn', kin folk, who settled on a wooded hill or 'snode'. Other early variations of the name are Kyngsnode; Kynsnoth, Kyngesnothe and Kingessnode.

The RAF and USAAF occupied RAF Kingsnorth, an airfield close to the village, during World War II.

Transport
Kingsnorth is bisected by the A2070 Ashford to Hamstreet road.  And briefly has a dual carriageway within it, as well as along its nearest border with Ashford, which serves as its main approach road.  The road network is otherwise almost a wide grid with slight curves.

The village is served by regular buses to Ashford.

References

External links
Statistical civil parish overview - map

Villages in Kent
Villages in the Borough of Ashford
Civil parishes in Ashford, Kent